Torralbilla is a municipality located in the province of Zaragoza, Aragon, Spain. According to the 2004 census (INE), the municipality has a population of 71.

History 
In 1248, granted by Jaime I, it became a municipality autonomous from  Daroca. This administrative regime lasted until the death of Fernando VII in 1833.

Heritage 
The town center has the San Lorenzo Catholic Church as one of its most significant buildings. Its baroque design dates from the 17th century. It has an octagonal tower, and a collection of altarpieces. One of the altarpieces stands out for its artistic quality and seniority, the altarpiece San Blas, from the 15th century is attributed to Juan de Bonilla.

Also interesting are the town hall and the two  dedicated to San Roque and San Ramón.

Environment  
Through Torralbilla cross the GR-90 path which along with an extensive network of trails over short distances, brings us to the nature of the region.

Nearby you can visit interesting natural spaces, such as the view of the Chapel of the Rosary, in Villarreal de Huerva. It is also highlighted the Anento's Aguallueve, the Cambrian reservoir from  Murero or Tower Campillo, in the municipality of Daroca, with four individual trees (a redwood, a pinsapo, a spruce and a cedar of Lebanon).

In the town are known as places of great beauty in the mountains Valdeyermo and La Dehesa, and also in the pine forest known as Las Hoyas, regular trips destination of locals and visitors.

References

Municipalities in the Province of Zaragoza